The 7th Golden Raspberry Awards were held on March 29, 1987, at the Hollywood Roosevelt Hotel to recognize the worst the movie industry had to offer in 1986. For the first time, the Razzies had a tie for Worst Picture, between Howard the Duck and Under the Cherry Moon.

Awards and nominations

Films with multiple nominations 
The following films received multiple nominations:

See also

1986 in film
59th Academy Awards
40th British Academy Film Awards
44th Golden Globe Awards

External links
Official summary of awards
 

Golden Raspberry Awards
07
1986 in American cinema
1987 in California
March 1987 events in the United States
Golden Raspberry